Jean-Philippe Mateta (born 28 June 1997) is a French professional footballer who plays as a striker for Premier League club Crystal Palace. He has represented France internationally at U19 and U21 youth levels.

Early life
Mateta was born in Sevran, a suburb of Paris, to a Congolese father and a French mother. His father is a former professional footballer who played in Congo and in Liège, Belgium.

Club career

Lyon
In September 2016, Mateta signed for Ligue 1 side Lyon from Châteauroux on a five-year contract for a fee of €2 million with a further €3 million possible in bonuses. His former club also retained a 20% sell-on clause on the player. Mateta made his debut for the Ligue 1 side on 21 September 2016 against Montpellier, replacing Maxwel Cornet after 76 minutes a 5–1 home win. He played his next match four months later in the Coupe de France, again coming on for Cornet against Montpellier, in the 76th minute of a 5–0 home win. He made his first Ligue 1 start against AS Monaco on 23 April 2017. He played 65 minutes, before being replaced by Mathieu Valbuena in a 2–1 home loss.

Le Havre (loan)
In July 2017, he joined Ligue 2 side Le Havre on a season-long loan. He scored 19 goals in 37 Ligue 2 matches across the 2017–18 season.

Mainz 05
On 29 June 2018, Mateta joined Bundesliga club 1. FSV Mainz 05 on a four-year deal. His arrival was the most expensive signing in club history. Upon signing with the club, the player was compared favorably to former Mainz strikers Aristide Bance and Adam Szalai as well as former 1. FC Köln and 1899 Hoffenheim player Anthony Modeste.

On 5 April 2019, Mateta scored his first senior hat-trick in a 5–0 league victory over SC Freiburg.

Crystal Palace
On 21 January 2021, Mateta signed for English club Crystal Palace on an initial eighteen-month loan deal. Crystal Palace reportedly paid a €3 million loan fee and secured an option to sign Mateta permanently for a further €15 million. He made his debut on 8 February in a 2–0 away league defeat by Leeds United. On 22 February 2021, Mateta scored his first goal for Palace in a 2–1 away league win over rivals Brighton & Hove Albion. The deal was made permanent on 31 January 2022.

Career statistics

References

External links

 Profile at the Crystal Palace F.C. website
 
 

1997 births
Living people
French sportspeople of Republic of the Congo descent
French footballers
Association football wingers
France under-21 international footballers
France youth international footballers
LB Châteauroux players
Olympique Lyonnais players
Le Havre AC players
1. FSV Mainz 05 players
Crystal Palace F.C. players
Ligue 1 players
Ligue 2 players
Championnat National players
Bundesliga players
Premier League players
French expatriate footballers
Expatriate footballers in England
Expatriate footballers in Germany
French expatriate sportspeople in England
French expatriate sportspeople in Germany
Black French sportspeople